KS Nowy Targ may refer to:

KS Górale Nowy Targ, one of two Polish Floorball League clubs located in Nowy Targ, Poland.
KS Podhale Nowy Targ, a now defunct Polish Floorball League club located in Nowy Targ, Poland.
KS Szarotka Nowy Targ, one of two Polish Floorball League clubs located in Nowy Targ, Poland.

See also
 Podhale Nowy Targ, an ice hockey team located in Nowy Targ, Podhale, Poland.
 Nowy Targ (disambiguation)